Xinghua Subdistrict is a subdistrict of Xinxing District, Qitaihe, Heilongjiang, People's Republic of China. , it has two residential communities under its administration.

See also
List of township-level divisions of Heilongjiang

References

Township-level divisions of Heilongjiang